The Vangen Church near Mission Hill, South Dakota was built in 1896.  It was added to the National Register of Historic Places in 1980.

Its weather vane is dated 1869 but it stands on a Queen Anne-style belfry that was built at a later date.

It has also been known as the Vangen Norwegian Evangelical Lutheran Church and, when listed, was believed to be the oldest Lutheran Church building surviving in the Dakotas.

References

External links

Churches on the National Register of Historic Places in South Dakota
Churches completed in 1869
Churches in Yankton County, South Dakota
1869 establishments in Dakota Territory
National Register of Historic Places in Yankton County, South Dakota